Malak El-Nasser (born January 19, 1954) is a Syrian Olympic athlete. She represented Syria in 1972 Summer Olympics in Munich. She is the first Syrian woman ever to participate in the Olympics.

Olympic participation

München 1972
El-Nasser the youngest and the only female participant for Syria in that tournament aged 18 years and 225 days then.

Athletics – Women's 800 metres – Round One
El-Nasser failed to qualify the first round to semi-finals and finished last in her heat in round one.

References

1954 births
Living people
Athletes (track and field) at the 1972 Summer Olympics
Syrian female athletes
Olympic athletes of Syria
20th-century Syrian women